The 1987 Korean Professional Football League was the fifth season of the K League. Before the start of this season, the Korean Professional Football Committee was separated from the Korea Football Association. A total of 5 professional teams participated in the league. Hanil Bank withdrew the league from this season. It began on 28 March and ended on 8 November 1987. It was operated with the home and away system for the first time.

League table

Top scorers

Awards

Main awards

Source:

Best XI

Source:

References

External links
 RSSSF
 Official website 

K League seasons
1
South Korea
South Korea